I-19 was a Japanese Type B1 submarine which damaged and destroyed several enemy ships during World War II while serving in the Imperial Japanese Navy. During the Guadalcanal Campaign, with a single torpedo salvo, the submarine sank the aircraft carrier  and the destroyer  and damaged the battleship .

Service history

Attacks off California
I-19 attacked the SS H.M. Storey as she was bringing oil to Los Angeles on 22 December 1941, chasing the ship for an hour. Two miles off Point Arguello California, 55 miles north of Santa Barbara, the captain of I-19, Narahara, fired three torpedoes at H.M. Storey. All missed. A US Navy plane saw the sub and dropped depth charges. The sub was forced to dive and end the attack.

Operation K
On 23 February 1942, I-19s Yokosuka E14Y (Glen) floatplane made a night reconnaissance over Pearl Harbor, Hawaii in preparation for Operation K, the second attack on Pearl Harbor by the Imperial Japanese Navy. On 4 March, she arrived at the French Frigate Shoals to serve as a radio beacon for the Kawanishi H8K (Emily) flying boats that were to attack Pearl Harbor. I-19 did not otherwise participate in the attack, which was carried out by two of the planned five H8Ks. No damages were inflicted by either H8K due to weather obscuring the target.

Aleutian Islands campaign
In early June 1942, I-19 took part in the opening stages of the Aleutian Islands campaign.

Sinking of USS Wasp and USS O'Brien
On 15 September 1942, while patrolling south of the Solomon Islands during the Guadalcanal Campaign under the command of Commander Takakazu Kinashi, I-19 sighted and attacked the U.S. carrier , firing a spread of six torpedoes. Three of the torpedoes hit the Wasp, causing heavy damage. With power knocked out, Wasp’s damage-control teams were unable to contain fires. She was abandoned and scuttled. 

The remaining three torpedoes from the spread hit the U.S. battleship  and the destroyer , the latter of which later sank on 19 October 1942 en route for repairs. North Carolina sustained significant damage and underwent repairs at Pearl Harbor until 16 November 1942.

I-19's torpedo salvo sank an aircraft carrier and a destroyer and severely damaged a battleship, making it one of the most damaging torpedo salvos in history.

"Tokyo Express"
From November 1942 until February 1943, I-19 assisted with nocturnal supply and reinforcement deliveries and, later, evacuations for Japanese forces on Guadalcanal. Such missions by Japanese ships to Guadalcanal were called the "Tokyo Express" by Allied forces.

Fiji
Between April and September 1943, I-19 was stationed off Fiji. During this time, the submarine, under the command of Kinashi Takakazu, sank two Allied cargo ships and heavily damaged one. After sinking the SS William K. Vanderbilt on 16 May 1943, I-19 surfaced and machine-gunned the surviving crew members in their lifeboats, killing one of them.

Loss
After I-19 submerged, Radford attacked with depth charges. I-19 was lost with all hands in this attack.

Notes

References

Type B1 submarines
Ships built by Mitsubishi Heavy Industries
1939 ships
World War II submarines of Japan
Ships of the Aleutian Islands campaign
Japanese submarines lost during World War II
World War II shipwrecks in the Pacific Ocean
Ships lost with all hands
Maritime incidents in November 1943